Hanegraaf is a Dutch surname. Notable people with the surname include:

 Jacques Hanegraaf (born 1960), Dutch cyclist
 Marijke Hanegraaf (born 1946), Dutch poet

See also
 Hanegraaff

Dutch-language surnames